Raphitoma horrida is a species of sea snail, a marine gastropod mollusk in the family Raphitomidae.

Description
The length of the shell reaches 13 mm.

Distribution
This species occurs in the Mediterranean Sea.

References

 Nordsieck F. (1977). The Turridae of the European seas. Roma: La Conchiglia. 131 pp.
 Gofas, S.; Le Renard, J.; Bouchet, P. (2001). Mollusca. in: Costello, M.J. et al. (eds), European Register of Marine Species: a check-list of the marine species in Europe and a bibliography of guides to their identification. Patrimoines Naturels. 50: 180-213

External links
 Monterosato T. A. (di) (1884). Nomenclatura generica e specifica di alcune conchiglie mediterranee. Palermo, Virzi, 152 pp
 Bucquoy E., Dautzenberg P. & Dollfus G. (1882-1886). Les mollusques marins du Roussillon. Tome Ier. Gastropodes. Paris: Baillière & fils. 570 pp., 66 pls. [pp. 1-40, pls 1-5, February 1882; pp. 41-84, pls 6-10, August 1882; pp. 85-135, pls 11-15, February 1883; pp. 136-196, pls 16-20, August 1883; pp. 197-222, pls 21-25, January 1884; pp. 223-258, pls 26-30, February 1884; pp. 259-298, pls 31-35, August 1884; pp. 299-342, pls 36-40, September 1884; pp. 343-386, pls 41-45, February 1885; pp. 387-418, pls 46-50, August 1885; pp. 419-454, pls 51-60, January 1886; pp. 455-486, pls 56-60, April 1886; pp. 487-570, pls 61-66, October 1886. ]
 Gastropods.com: Raphitoma (Raphitoma) horrida
 
 Natural History Museum, Rotterdam: Raphitoma horrida

horrida
Gastropods described in 1884